Tupanatinga is a city located in the state of Pernambuco, Brazil. Located  at 306 km away from Recife, capital of the state of Pernambuco. Has an estimated (IBGE 2020) population of 27,551 inhabitants.

Geography
 State - Pernambuco
 Region - Agreste Pernambucano
 Boundaries - Sertânia   (N);  Itaíba    (S);  Buique   (E);   Ibimirim    (W).
 Area - 795.64 km2
 Elevation - 710 m
 Hydrography - Moxotó and Ipanema rivers
 Vegetation - Caatinga Hiperxerófila
 Climate - Semi arid hot
 Annual average temperature - 22.3 c
 Distance to Recife - 306 km

Economy
The main economic activities in Tupanatinga are based in agribusiness, especially  beans, cashew nuts, corn; and livestock such as cattle, goats, sheep, pigs, horses and poultry.

Economic indicators

Economy by Sector
2006

Health indicators

References

Municipalities in Pernambuco